Ernst Eberhard von Ihne (23 May 1848 – 21 April 1917) was a German architect. He served as official architect to the German Emperor Frederick III and to his son and successor Wilhelm II. Among his best known works are the Prussian Royal Library building (today House 1 of the Berlin State Library), the Neuer Marstall, and the Kaiser-Friedrich-Museum (today the Bode Museum). He was born  in Elberfeld and died in Berlin.

Gallery

Further reading 
 
 Oliver Sander: Die Rekonstruktion des Architektennachlasses von Ernst v. Ihne (1848–1917). Diss. Humboldt University of Berlin, Berlin 2000.

External links 
 
 Entry for Ernst von Ihne on the Union List of Artist Names
 Brief entry on Ihne from the Oxford Dictionary of Architecture & Landscaping.
 Entry on Ihne from historismus.net 

1848 births
1917 deaths
Historicist architects
19th-century German architects
People from Elberfeld
Architects from Wuppertal